The Château de Méréville is a chateau in Méréville in the valley of the Juine, France.  It is the rival of the Désert de Retz as two of the most extensive Landscape Gardens provided with follies and picturesque features — parcs à fabriques — made in the late eighteenth century. Both are early examples of the romantic French Landscape Garden — jardin a l'anglaise — an interpretation of the English garden style that was replacing the Garden à la française.  the Château de Méréville and garden park survive, partially dismantled.

After being owned by a Japanese pension fund who planned to turn it into a golf resort, in 2000 the chateau was bought by the regional government. As of 2008, plans to restore it had made little progress.

History

Up to 1786
The château was first built as a medieval fortress, and then rebuilt on the medieval buildings' remains in 1768 for the conseiller du roi Jean Delpech.  The 1768 phase was provided with modest formal gardens formed as regular parterres.

1786-1796
The château and its park in the French gardening style were bought in 1784 as the last of his country houses by the financier Jean-Joseph de Laborde, one of the richest financiers of the Ancien Régime, after his neighbours gave him the chance to do so.  On this marshy land he decided to rebuild the château and create a large landscape park to his own taste.  To this end he commissioned major artists such as Bélanger (famous in this decade for having constructed Bagatelle in only two months for the Comte d'Artois), the famous cabinetmaker Leleu, the sculptor Augustin Pajou and the painter Claude Joseph Vernet.

In 1786, after the new pont des roches (a two-level bridge over the Juine) subsided, and Bélanger's plans were threatening to prove too expensive even for the marquis (he habitually spent without keeping count of spending, which as a sensible administrator the marquis could not accept).  Bélanger was thus sacked as chief architect in May that year and replaced by Hubert Robert (who had left the prestigious French School in Rome and was already known as the ruins painter or "Robert-les-ruines"), though Bélanger remained onsite for the construction of the circular temple of filial piety (built in honour of the marquis' daughter Natalie, containing a marble bust of her by Augustin Pajou).

The following year, 1787, in some of the most exceptional hydrographic work of the period, the rerouting of the Juine took a long time to achieve.  Next, an entirely new type of structure was built on a small island in the centre of the main lake - a rostral column, in honour of the marquis' two young sons Edouard (1762–1786) and Ange Auguste (1766–1786), news of whose disappearance had arrived in France earlier that year.  They had died young at sea in Lituya Bay during the La Pérouse expedition.

The park is in the marquis' own image, showing his admiration for navigation and discovery (not only the rostral column, but also the cenotaph in honour of the Englishman Captain Cook, are the most obvious indicators of this), his love of nature and beautiful plants (linked to exploration in this era of botany and classification - the park is stuffed with rare imported species, acclimatised to their new habitat by the rich soil of the Méréville Valley), and his memory of his youth in the Basque and the mountainous Pyrénées (a rocky waterfall, spiral staircases down into grottoes, and dénivellés).  It also shows off his riches, with bridges "aux boules d'or" (with gold spheres), grottoes adorned with thousands of pieces of gold leaf or precious and semi-precious stones, and above all a pebble-paved road which gives the park such a great cachet.

The construction took ten years and nearly 700 workers, of which a large majority were specialist craftsmen.  Robert transformed into a landscape of open meadows and belts of trees contained within a wide bowl, which became dotted with eye-catching features with a few years.  Chateaubriand called the result an oasis.  In its return to nature or at least to the illusion of nature (the ruined bridge, and the facts that the trees were all planted in positions intended to surprise the visitor and the caves were all man-made), the park's style can be described as Romantic, though it also contains elements of "anglo-chinois" (the belvédère).

Gallery

See also
French landscape garden
:Category:Garden design history of France
Remarkable Gardens of France

References

Bélanger  Méréville, historique, plan...

Bibliography
Bergerin (Flore de), Les jardins de Jean-Joseph de Laborde. Le parc de Méréville au XVIIIe siècle, 1994
Delmas (Jean-François), "Jean-Joseph de Laborde et le domaine de Méréville", in État et société en France aux XVIIe-XVIIIe siècles, mélanges Yves Durand, Paris, PUPS, 2000, p. 181-193
Lansel (Ch.), "Méréville, son château et son parc", Paris, J. Dumaine, 1877

External links
  Domaine départemental de Méréville

Gardens in Essonne
French landscape gardens
Châteaux in Essonne
Baroque buildings in France